Bishopscourt is a large colonial mansion located on Clarendon Street in East Melbourne, Australia.

Designed by Newson & Blackburn using blue stone in a style of gothic architecture, it was completed in 1853. The red brick wing was added in 1903.

Since completion, it has been used as the residence for all of Melbourne's Anglican diocesan bishops and archbishops. From 1874 to 1876 it was used as Victoria's Government House.

The house is on the Victorian Heritage Register.

Sources 

Episcopal palaces
Gothic Revival architecture in Melbourne
Heritage-listed buildings in Melbourne
Buildings and structures in the City of Melbourne (LGA)
East Melbourne, Victoria
1853 establishments in Australia
Buildings and structures completed in 1853